The X-Patents are all the patents issued by the United States Patent and Trademark Office from July 1790 (when the first U.S. patent was issued), to July 1836. The actual number is unknown, but the best estimate is 9,957. The records were burned in a fire, in December 1836, while in temporary storage. No copies or rosters were maintained by the government at the time, leaving only the inventors' copies to reconstruct the collection.

The USPTO and its earliest days

The Patent Commission of the U.S. was created in 1790. Its first three members were Secretary of State Thomas Jefferson, Secretary of War Henry Knox, and Attorney General Edmund Randolph.

On July 31, 1790, inventor Samuel Hopkins of Pittsford, Vermont became the first person to be issued a patent in the United States. His patented invention was an improvement in the "making of Pot Ash by a new apparatus & process." The earliest patent law required that a working model of each invention be produced in miniature.

The Patent Law was revised for the first time in 1793. It adopted a simple registration system where a patent would be granted for a $30 fee. The Patent Board was replaced by a clerk in the Department of State. James Madison, Secretary of State, created a separate Patent Office within the State Department and he appointed Dr. William Thornton as its first superintendent in May 1802.

The Patent Office was the only major government building to survive the British invasion of Washington, D.C., during the War of 1812. This is credited to Dr. William Thornton who was building a musical instrument in the same building. He persuaded British officers that they would be destroying the shared intellectual record of mankind if the patents were burned.

The 1836 fire

The Patent Office 1836 fire occurred on December 15 when the patents were in temporary storage while a new (more fireproof) facility was being built.

Recovery of the X-Patents

The United States Congress immediately passed a law to aid re-issuing of the missing patents after the fire. About 2,800 such patents have been recovered, and 1,989 are online.

Up until five months prior to the fire, U.S. patents had not been numbered, and were identified by titles and dates. The first patent denoted with the serial numbering system still in use today was issued on July 13, 1836, and was given the number 1. The recovered patents are also numbered from 1, but these numbers have an "X" added to them. The X is generally added to the end of the number except for the first patent which has the X in the beginning of the number. Therefore, they are called X-Patents.

When an earlier patent was recovered and re-issued, the USPTO sometimes gave it a fractional number (e.g. 2960½X, issued on June 2, 1818; 8736¾X, issued on March 27, 1835) to preserve the correct sequence. Most, but not all, fractional patents are X-Patents.

The latest X-Patents were recovered in 2004 from the Dartmouth College archives. Of the 14 found, 10 were granted to Samuel Morey including the first known patent for an internal combustion engine.

A list of some X-Patents

See also
 Patent Office 1877 fire

References

External links
 X-Patents Online at USPTO Website
 Interesting Patent Events
 The U.S. Patent No. X1
 "Patent Models’ Strange Odyssey" by Teresa Riordan, The New York Times, February 18, 2002.
 Early patent records found in library

1836 in American law
United States patent law
Legal history of the United States
History of patent law